Abaja may refer to several places in Estonia:

Abaja, Järva County, village in Koeru Parish, Järva County
Abaja, Saare County, village in Kihelkonna Parish, Saare County